Seven is a 2023 Bengali crime thriller web series starring Rahul Arunoday Banerjee, Gaurav Chakrabarty, Ridhima Ghosh, Suprobhat Das, Ankita Chakraborty and Anjan Dutt in key roles. Anjan also wrote and directed the series, and it features music scored by Neel Dutt, cinematography by Pravatendu Mondal, and editing by Arghyakamal Mitra. Set in a misty hill station, Seven follows five friends on a trip. Uncovering a bag containing dollars and a gun, the friends soon find themselves entangled in a thrilling mystery. The series premiered on ZEE5 on 17 March 2023.

Plot 
Five friends - Subir, Bibek, Ananto, Namita and Ria - embark on a leisure trip to LAVA homestay. On their journey, they stumble upon a bike accident with a bag full of money and a gun. Subir takes the bag, hoping it will solve all their troubles. But the bag and gun soon cause a heated disagreement between them.

Cast 

 Rahul Arunoday Banerjee
 Gaurav Chakrabarty
 Ridhima Ghosh
 Suprobhat Das
 Ankita Chakraborty
 Anjan Dutt

Development

Production 
The series is produced under the Anjan Dutt Production banner.

Release 
In early 2022, ZEE5 announced a slate of Bengali series and films, with Seven being one of them.

On 11 March 2023, ZEE5 unveiled the first look trailer of Seven depicting five friends on a hilly journey that quickly turns awry after an accident. The unexpected event leaves them with a dead body, a gun, and a bag of money.

This seven-episode series started streaming on ZEE5 from 17 March 2023.

Episodes

Season 1

References

External links 
 
 Seven on ZEE5

Bengali-language web series
2023 web series debuts
Crime thriller web series